The electoral district of Inala is an electoral district of the Legislative Assembly of Queensland in south-west Brisbane. It includes the suburbs of Inala, Ellen Grove, Forest Lake, Doolandella, Durack, Wacol, Richlands and parts of Oxley. It borders the electoral districts of Mount Ommaney, Miller, Algester, Jordan, Bundamba and Moggill.

The Inala electoral district was created in the 1990 redistribution as part of the one vote one value reforms under Wayne Goss, and was contested for the first time at the 1992 election.

For its entire existence, it has been held by the Labor Party.  Henry Palaszczuk, the seat's first member, transferred from Archerfield to Inala upon Inala's creation in 1992.  He went on to become a senior minister in the Beattie government.  Henry retired in 2006 and handed the seat to his daughter and current member, Annastacia Palaszczuk, who has been the Premier of Queensland since 2015.

For most of its existence, Inala has been a comfortably safe Labor seat, and on several occasions it was the safest Labor seat in the state.  The only time the Labor hold on Inala was seriously threatened was in 2012, when Annastacia lost over 17 percent of her primary vote from 2009–to date, the only time that Labor hasn't won the seat outright on the primary vote. She suffered a 14-point two-party swing, reducing her majority to 6.2 percent. Annastacia was elected as leader of what remained of Labor, and led her party back to government in 2015. Along the way, she reverted Inala to its traditional status as a comfortably safe Labor seat; her majority ballooned to 25 percent, the second-safest seat in the entire chamber. She consolidated her majority in 2017 and 2020, and now sits on a majority of 28.1 percent, the safest seat in the state.

Members for Inala

Election results

References

Inala